Ahmad al-Emran is a Kuwaiti handball player. He competed in the 1980 Summer Olympics.

References

Living people
Handball players at the 1980 Summer Olympics
Kuwaiti male handball players
Olympic handball players of Kuwait
Year of birth missing (living people)